Dmitri Sokolov (born 19 March 1988) is a Russian professional racing cyclist, who currently rides for UCI Continental team . He rode in the men's team pursuit at the 2016 UCI Track Cycling World Championships.

Major results

2005
 1st  Time trial, UEC European Junior Road Championships
 8th Time trial, UCI Juniors World Championships
2006
 1st  Time trial, UEC European Junior Road Championships
 1st Stage 2 Giro di Basilicata
 2nd Overall Trofeo Karlsberg
1st Stage 1
 UCI Juniors World Championships
4th Road race
4th Time trial
2007
 7th Time trial, UEC European Under-23 Road Championships
2008
 3rd GP Capodarco
 4th Time trial, UEC European Under-23 Road Championships
2012
 2nd  Team pursuit, 2012–13 UCI Track Cycling World Cup, Cali
 2nd Time trial, National Road Championships
 7th Memorial Davide Fardelli
2015
 2015–16 UCI Track Cycling World Cup, Cali
1st  Team pursuit
3rd  Individual pursuit
 10th Overall Vuelta a la Comunidad de Madrid
2016
 10th Klasika Primavera
2017
 2nd  Team pursuit, 2016–17 UCI Track Cycling World Cup, Cali
 3rd  Team pursuit, 2017–18 UCI Track Cycling World Cup, Pruszków
 3rd  Team pursuit, UEC European Track Championships
2018
 1st  Overall Tour of Iran (Azerbaijan)
1st Stage 2
 2nd  Team pursuit, 2017–18 UCI Track Cycling World Cup, Minsk
 2nd Overall Giro della Regione Friuli Venezia Giulia
2020
 10th Grand Prix Mount Erciyes

References

External links
 

1988 births
Living people
Russian male cyclists
Place of birth missing (living people)
Russian track cyclists
Cyclists at the 2016 Summer Olympics
Olympic cyclists of Russia
People from Izhevsk
Sportspeople from Udmurtia